Kiyan Soltanpour (born 23 July 1989) is an Azerbaijani-Iranian footballer who plays for German club TuS Makkabi Berlin.

Career

Club
Kiyan Soltanpour made his Sumgayit FK first-team debut on 16 August 2014 against Khazar Lankaran FK. He made his first goal in Sumgayit FK on 30 August 2014 against Araz-Naxçıvan PFK.

International
Born to an Iranian father and an Azerbaijani mother, Soltanpour was eligible to play for the Iran national football team as well as Azerbaijan. In 2014, he accepted a call up from the Azerbaijan national football team.

Career statistics

References

External links

1989 births
Living people
Azerbaijani footballers
Azerbaijani expatriate footballers
German footballers
Iranian footballers
German people of Iranian descent
1. FC Union Berlin players
Borussia Dortmund II players
1. FC Saarbrücken players
Berliner AK 07 players
Sumgayit FK players
FC Viktoria 1889 Berlin players
Oberliga (football) players
3. Liga players
Regionalliga players
Azerbaijan Premier League players
Footballers from Berlin
German people of Azerbaijani descent
Sportspeople of Iranian descent
Association football forwards